The 2018–19 EBU Player of the Year Championship was the competition's fifth season. Points were accumulated over the EBU's ten most prestigious events from 1 October 2018 to 30 September 2019. Graham Osborne won his first title, becoming the fifth player to win the championship.

List of Competitions

Summary of Results

This list displays the top ten players (including ties); 129 players received points. Winners of each event are highlighted in bold.

References

Contract bridge competitions
Contract bridge in the United Kingdom